GMHS may refer to:
 Glyceryl monohydroxystearate

Schools 
 Garner Magnet High School, Garner, North Carolina, United States
 General McLane High School, Edinboro, Pennsylvania, United States
 George Mason High School, Falls Church, Virginia, United States
 Granby Memorial High School, Granby, Connecticut, United States
 Great Mills High School, Great Mills, Maryland, United States
 Green Mountain High School, Lakewood, Colorado, United States
 Groveport Madison High School, Groveport, Ohio, United States
 Guam High School, Agana Heights, Guam, United States